Linaria vulgaris, the common toadflax, yellow toadflax or butter-and-eggs, is a species of flowering plant in the family Plantaginaceae, native to Europe, Siberia and Central Asia. It has also been introduced and is now common in North America.

Growth
The flowers are mostly visited by bumblebees.

Ecology

The plant is widespread on ruderal spots, along roads, in dunes, and on disturbed and cultivated land.

Because the flower is largely closed by its underlip, pollination requires strong insects such as bees and bumblebees (Bombus species).

Linaria vulgaris is a food plant for a large number of insects such as the sweet gale moth (Acronicta euphorbiae), mouse moth (Amphipyra tragopoginis), silver Y (Autographa gamma), Calophasia lunula, gorgone checkerspot (Charidryas gorgone carlota), toadflax pug (Eupithecia linariata), satyr pug (Eupithecia satyrata), Falseuncaria ruficiliana, bog fritillary (Boloria eunomia), Pyrrhia umbra, brown rustic (Rusina ferruginea), and Stenoptilia bipunctidactyla.

It may be mildly toxic to livestock.

Fossil record
Seeds of the common toadflax, were identified from the Hoxnian interglacial strata at Clacton. Records have also come from the Weichselian glaciation strata in Essex, Huntingdonshire, Surrey and North Wales. This evidence makes the native status of the plant in Britain quite evident despite the very strong association that it has today with waste places and man-made habitats.

Cultivation and uses
While most commonly found as a wildflower, toadflax is sometimes cultivated for cut flowers, which are long-lasting in the vase. Like snapdragons (Antirrhinum), they are often grown in children's gardens for the "snapping" flowers which can be made to "talk" by squeezing them at the base of the corolla.

The plant requires ample drainage, but is otherwise adaptable to a variety of conditions. It has escaped from cultivation in North America where it is common on roadsides and in poor soils, where it has now naturalized in many U.S. states and Canadian provinces.

Despite its reputation as a weed, like the dandelion, this plant has also been used in folk medicine for a variety of ailments. A tea made from the leaves was taken as a laxative and strong diuretic as well as for jaundice, dropsy, and enteritis with drowsiness. For skin diseases and piles, either a leaf tea or an ointment made from the flowers was used. In addition, a tea made in milk instead of water has been used as an insecticide. It is confirmed to have diuretic and fever-reducing properties.

Other names
Linaria acutiloba  is a synonym. Because this plant grows as a weed, it has acquired a large number of local colloquial names, including brideweed, bridewort, butter and eggs (but see Lotus corniculatus), butter haycocks, bread and butter, bunny haycocks, bunny mouths, calf's snout, Continental weed, dead men's bones, devil's flax, devil's flower, doggies, dragon bushes, eggs and bacon (but see Lotus corniculatus), eggs and butter, false flax, flaxweed, fluellen (but see Kickxia), gallweed, gallwort, impudent lawyer, Jacob's ladder (but see Polemonium), lion's mouth, monkey flower (but see Mimulus), North American ramsted, rabbit flower, rancid, ransted, snapdragon (but see Antirrhinum), wild flax, wild snapdragon, wild tobacco (but see Nicotiana), yellow rod, yellow toadflax.

References

External links

 Species Profile - Yellow Toadflax (Linaria vulgaris), National Invasive Species Information Center, United States National Agricultural Library. Lists general information and resources for yellow toadflax.

vulgaris
Medicinal plants
Flora of Europe
Flora of temperate Asia
Ruderal species
Taxa named by Philip Miller